Regarding Henry is a 1991 American drama film directed by Mike Nichols and written by J.J. Abrams. It stars Harrison Ford as a New York City lawyer from a dysfunctional family, who struggles to regain his memory and recover his speech and mobility after he survives a shooting, inadvertently restoring his family's integrity in the process.

The supporting cast includes Annette Bening, Mikki Allen, Bill Nunn, Rebecca Miller, Bruce Altman and Elizabeth Wilson. The film received mixed reviews with praise for the cast and Ford's performance but criticized for its sentimentality and manipulativeness. The film grossed $88 million at the box office on a production budget of $25 million.

Plot

Ambitious, callous, narcissistic, and at times unethical, Henry Turner is a wealthy successful Manhattan lawyer whose obsession with his work leaves him little time for his socialite wife, Sarah, and troubled preteen daughter, Rachel. He has just won a malpractice suit, defending a hospital against a plaintiff who claims, but is unable to prove, that he warned doctors about a pre-existing condition.

Running out to a convenience store to buy cigarettes one night, Henry is shot when he interrupts a robbery. One bullet hits his right frontal lobe, while the other hits his left subclavian artery, causing excessive internal bleeding and cardiac arrest. He experiences anoxia, resulting in brain damage.

Henry survives but can neither move nor talk and he suffers retrograde amnesia. While in a nursing facility, he slowly regains movement and speech with the help of a physical therapist named Bradley. Henry's recovery creates a financial burden for the family. Upon returning home, Henry is almost childlike. As he forges new relationships with his family, he realizes he does not like who he once was.

Sarah enrolls Rachel into an out-of-town elite school, though she is now reluctant to go. At orientation, Henry tells Rachel a lie to help her adjust to the new school. He and Sarah grow closer, as they were when they first met. Henry also misses Rachel.

Henry's firm allows him to return out of deference to his previous contributions. Sarah suggests they relocate to a smaller, less expensive residence. As his firm essentially assigns him only low-level work, he realizes he no longer wants to be a lawyer. While at a dinner party, they overhear several "friends" making derogatory comments about him.

Henry, finding a former colleague's letters to Sarah disclosing they had an affair, becomes angry and leaves home. He is confronted by Linda, a fellow attorney, who reveals they were having an affair and that he was going to leave Sarah. Henry has second thoughts about himself and his relationships.

Henry gives the documents that his firm suppressed to the plaintiff that proves their case, and he apologizes. He then resigns from the firm. He realizes that, as Sarah had said, everything had been wrong before but it is now so much better. They reconcile, then go to Rachel's school and withdraw her. She is overjoyed to be with her parents. As they leave the building, she tosses her school-uniform hat away.

Cast

 Harrison Ford as Henry Turner
 Annette Bening as Sarah Turner
 Bill Nunn as Bradley
 Rebecca Miller as Linda
 Bruce Altman as Bruce
 Mikki Allen as Rachel Turner
 Elizabeth Wilson as Jessica
 Donald Moffat as Charlie Cameron
 James Rebhorn as Dr. Sultan
 Robin Bartlett as Phyllis
 John Leguizamo as Convenience Store Robber
 J. J. Abrams as Delivery Boy (as Jeffrey Abrams)

Production  
The film was shot on location in New York City, White Plains, and Millbrook.

Music

Original soundtrack
Regarding Henry: Music From the Motion Picture Soundtrack was released on August 6, 1991 on Capitol Records/EMI Records.

Track listing
"Walkin' Talkin' Man"
"A Cold Day in NY"
"Blowfish"
"Ritz"
"Henry Vs Henry"
"Ritz Part II"
"I Don't Like Eggs"
"Gotta Get Me Some of That"
"Central Park, 6PM"
"Buddy Grooves"

Personnel
 Hans Zimmer: composer, arranger, keyboards, synthesizer, programming (Akai, Yamaha DX Series, Steinberg)
 Kathy Lenski: violin
 Kirke Godfrey: drum programming, percussion
 Bruce Fowler: arranger [strings], percussion
 Kyle Eastwood: bass guitar, synthesized bass
 Walt Fowler: horns
 Bobby McFerrin: background vocals
 Jay Rifkin: recording engineer, mixing engineer
 Mike Stevens, Nico Golfar: assistant recording engineers

Reception

Critical reception
Initial critical reception was mainly lukewarm to negative. Vincent Canby of The New York Times described the film as "a sentimental urban fairy tale" that "succeeds neither as an all-out inspirational drama nor as a send-up of American manners."

Roger Ebert of the Chicago Sun-Times rated the film two out of four stars and commented, "There is possibly a good movie to be found somewhere within this story, but Mike Nichols has not found it in Regarding Henry. This is a film of obvious and shallow contrivance, which aims without apology for easy emotional payoffs, and tries to manipulate the audience with plot twists that belong in a sitcom." Ebert also described the way it makes a connection between Ritz Crackers and the Ritz-Carlton hotel (which reveals that Henry's affair had in fact been deeply embedded in his apparently lost memories) as "especially annoying", apparently regarding it as comic.

Rita Kempley of The Washington Post called the film "a tidy parable of '90s sanctimony" while Peter Travers of Rolling Stone described it as a "slick tearjerker" that "has a knack for trivializing the big issues it strenuously raises." However, he praised Ford's performance.

Variety, however, called the film "a subtle emotional journey impeccably orchestrated by director Mike Nichols and acutely well acted."

The review aggregator website Rotten Tomatoes reported a "Rotten" 45% rating based on 31 reviews, with an average rating of 5.3/10. The site's critics consensus reads, "Although Harrison Ford makes the most of an opportunity to dig into a serious role, Regarding Henry is undermined by cheap sentiment and clichés." On Metacritic, the film has a weighted average score of 47 out of 100 based on 23 critics, indicating "mixed or average reviews". Audiences polled by CinemaScore gave the film an average grade of "A-" on an A+ to F scale.

Box office
The film opened in 800 theaters in the United States on July 12, 1991, and grossed $6,146,782 on its opening weekend, ranking seventh at the US box office. It eventually grossed $43,001,500 in the United States and Canada. It grossed $44.9 million internationally for a worldwide total of $87.9 million.

Accolades  
The London Film Critics' Circle named Annette Bening Newcomer of the Year for her work in Regarding Henry, in addition to the films Guilty by Suspicion, The Grifters, Valmont and Postcards from the Edge. The film was nominated for the Young Artist Award for Best Family Motion Picture - Drama, and Mikki Allen was nominated Best Young Actress Starring in a Motion Picture.

The film was nominated in 2006 by the American Film Institute for their 100 Years...100 Cheers list, but was not selected.

Home media   
The film was released on Region 1 DVD on September 9, 2003. It is in anamorphic widescreen format with audio tracks in English and French and subtitles in English. Australian premium label Imprint Films released the film on Blu-ray in April 2021.

See also

 List of films featuring diabetes

References

External links
 
 
 
 

1991 drama films
1991 films
1990s American films
1990s English-language films
American drama films
Films about amnesia
Films about dysfunctional families
Films about lawyers
Films directed by Mike Nichols
Films produced by Scott Rudin
Films scored by Hans Zimmer
Films set in New York City
Films with screenplays by J. J. Abrams
Paramount Pictures films
Films about disability